Sarah Mahboob Khan (born 9 February 1991) is a Pakistani tennis player.

Playing for Pakistan at the Fed Cup, Mahboob Khan has a win–loss of 2–8.

Career
Sarah Mahboob Khan was born in Rawalpindi, Pakistan. Her father Mahboob is a tennis coach. In 2004, Sarah Mahboob Khan became the youngest ever Pakistan National Champion, aged 14.

She has been Pakistan's leading tennis player since 2005. She is the only player to have won Pakistan national titles on clay, hard, and grass, and has won a record number of National Rankings Ladies' Singles Titles.

In October 2010, Sarah Mahboob Khan became the first Pakistani female tennis player to qualify for the main draw of an ITF tournament outside Pakistan, and the first to reach the quarter-final of an ITF tournament, achieving this in the doubles at Ain Sukhna, Egypt, partnering Irina Constantinide.

In May 2011, she signed to play for the tennis team of the University of New Mexico.

After her sophomore year, Khan transferred to play for James Madison University in Virginia, where she played for four years and graduated in May 2015. She then returned to Pakistan.

Fed Cup participation

Singles

Doubles

References

External links
 
 
 

1991 births
Living people
Pakistani female tennis players
Racket sportspeople from Rawalpindi
James Madison University alumni
Sportswomen from Punjab, Pakistan
Tennis players at the 2018 Asian Games
Asian Games competitors for Pakistan
South Asian Games bronze medalists for Pakistan
South Asian Games medalists in tennis
21st-century Pakistani women